The Secondary School Eça de Queirós is a secondary school located in the civil parish of Póvoa de Varzim, Beiriz e Argivai, in the Portuguese Norte region, founded on 14 June 1904.

History
At the beginning of 1904, the municipal council presented to the government a petition to create the lyceum of Póvoa de Varzim, owing to the fact that the Instituto de Instrução Primária (Institute for Primary Instruction) was unable to satisfy its objectives. On 14 July, a decree was published to create the Liceu Nacional da Póvoa de Varzim, even before the construction of a building. The institution passed between different buildings in the meantime. Between 1912 and 1914, the lyceum was installed in the former Colégio das Doroteias. Between 1914 and 1916, it moved to the Colégio Povoense, when it changed its name to the Liceu Nacional Eça de Queirós. But, between 1916 and 1925, it occupied the building owned by the Silveira Campos family, but which was forced to abandon the site because the building faced collapsed. Between 1925 and 1952, it occupied the installations of the deactivated Fábrica do Gás (gas factory).

On 24 November 1945, a decree (35/201) was published, announced the construction of a formal building for the lyceum. This began a new phase for its inauguration that included the selection of land, expropriation and debate on urban issues. Then, in 1947, the school adopted a new designation: the Liceu Nacional da Póvoa de Varzim (National Lyceum of Póvoa da Varzim). At the end of the decade (in April 1949), they actually began building by the Junta das Construções para o Ensino Técnico e Secundário (Board of Constructions for Technical and Secondary Education): the building was expected to finish at the end 1951. It was inaugurated on 18 October 1952.

Between 1960 and 1961, the school was expanded on its western wing: there was an increase of 14 halls, two for design and manual works, and the adaption of one hall into a girl's gymnasium. By 1961–1963, the school already required expansion. Again (between 1962 and 1963), the school was expanded to add another three halls for classes, a covered recreational space and bathrooms.

In 1979, the school adopted the name Escola Secundária Eça de Queirós.

On 24 August 2006, the building was alternately classified in terms of the transitory regime, under article 1 of decree 173/2006 (Diário da República, Série 1, 16), which expired on 8 September 2001.

Architecture
The school is located in an isolated, urban zone totally occupied from the block defined to the north by the Rua Dr. Alberto Pimentel, east by Rua Padre Afonso Soares, west to Rua de Camilo and south by the Rua Dr. Leonardo Coimbra. Alongside is the Escola Primária da Póvoa de Varzim/Escola Nova (Primary School of Póvoa de Varzim) and the Basílica do Sagrado Coração de Jesus (Basillica of the Sacred Heart of Jesus).

The rectangular building, constructed laterally on a two-floor paln, comprising four rectangular wings, interconnected to create and interior uncovered patio. In addition to the lateral left, there is a secondary "L-shaped" extension. The facades are plastered and painted in beige, circled by entablatures of granite and decorated by friezes and cornices in granite. The principal facade (oriented to the southeast) is marked by several faces, some detached and slightly advanced, framed by granite wedges, formed by overlapping silhouettes with filled joints. This facade includes a composition with three windows, interconnected by granite parapets.

References

Notes

Sources
 

1904 establishments in Portugal
Secondary schools in Portugal
Buildings and structures in Póvoa de Varzim